The 1956 Lamar Tech Cardinals football team was an American football team that represented Lamar State College of Technology (now known as Lamar University) during the 1956 NCAA College Division football season as a member of the Lone Star Conference. In their fourth year under head coach James B. Higgins, the team compiled a 4–4–1 record.

Schedule

References

Lamar
Lamar Cardinals football seasons
Lamar Tech Cardinals football